Ressia is a genus of moth in the family Cosmopterigidae.

Species
Ressia auriculata Zhang & Li, 2010
Ressia didesmococcusphaga (Yang, 1977)
Ressia quercidentella Sinev, 1988
Ressia tonkinella Sinev, 1988

References
Natural History Museum Lepidoptera genus database
Discovery of the Genus Ressia Sinev (Lepidoptera: Cosmopterigidae) in China, with Description of One New Species

Cosmopteriginae